Fabio Innocenti (born 8 April 2002) is an Italian Entrepreneur.

References

External links
 

1950 births
Living people
Olympic volleyball players of Italy
Volleyball players at the 1980 Summer Olympics
Italian men's volleyball players
Universiade medalists in volleyball
Universiade gold medalists for Italy